The flag of Gabon is a tricolour consisting of three horizontal green, yellow and blue bands.  Adopted in 1960 to replace the previous colonial flag containing the French Tricolour at the canton, it has been the flag of the Gabonese Republic since the country gained independence that year.  The design of the present flag entailed the removal the Tricolour and the widening of the yellow stripe at the centre.

History
The French gained control of modern-day Gabon in 1839, when a local chief surrendered the sovereignty of his land to them.  The Berlin Conference of 1885 solidified France's claim to the territory through diplomatic recognition, and it later became part of French Equatorial Africa in 1910.  Under French colonial rule over Gabon, the authorities forbade the colony from utilizing its own distinctive colonial flag.  This was because they were worried that this could increase nationalistic sentiment and lead to calls for independence.  However, with the rise of the decolonization movement in Africa, the French were obliged to grant limited autonomy to Gabon as a self-governing republic within the French Community.  This was granted in 1958 after a referendum was held supporting the proposal.

Gabon – considered "one of the more progressive" of French colonies – swiftly formulated a design for a new flag, which was officially adopted a year later in 1959.  It featured a horizontal tricolour identical to the current flag, but with the yellow stripe at the centre narrower than the green and blue bands surrounding it.  The French Tricolour was situated at the canton of the flag, making Gabon the only French autonomous republic to feature this "symbolic link" with France.

On 9 August 1960 – just over a week before Gabon became an independent country on 17 August – the flag was slightly modified.  The change entailed removing the Tricolour at the canton and enlarging the yellow stripe at the centre, thus giving it equal width with the two other bands.

Design

Symbolism
The colours and symbols of the flag carry cultural, political, and regional meanings.  The yellow alludes to the Equator – which cuts across the country – and also symbolizes the sun.  The green epitomizes the natural resources of Gabon, as well as its "extensive forested area" that the Gabonese people are economically dependent on in the form of lumber.  The blue represents the sea, specifically the South Atlantic Ocean along which the country has an "extensive coast".  While Whitney Smith in the Encyclopædia Britannica and Dorling Kindersley's Complete Flags of the World describe the centre band as solely yellow, The World Factbook characterizes it as both yellow and gold.

Distinctiveness
The proportions of Gabon's flag are 3:4.  This uncommon flag ratio, which is enshrined by Gabonese law, is shared by the flags of only three other countries – Democratic Republic of the Congo (some sources state that the proportions are 2:3), Papua New Guinea and San Marino.  Furthermore, the country's flag does not utilize the green, yellow and red colours of the Pan-Africanist movement, in contrast to its neighbouring countries.  Unlike other former French colonies in Africa, the flag consists of a horizontal tricolour, rather than a vertical one modelled after the flag of France.

Presidential flags

Naval flags

Ethnic group flags

Provincial flags

Municipal flags

Historical flags

References

External links 

Gabon Flag at World Flags 101

Flags introduced in 1960
Flag
Flags of Africa
National flags